Aleksander Jan Hall (born 20 May 1953 in Gdańsk) is a Polish conservative political thinker, scholar and retired politician. Activist of Movement for Defense of Human and Civic Rights, later a politician and member of Solidarity Electoral Action. In 2001, he quit politics to focus on research. Author of many books and articles on history, patriotism, etc. He is married to Katarzyna Hall.

References

1953 births
Living people
Politicians from Gdańsk
Polish male writers